A somersault (also flip, heli, and in gymnastics salto) is an acrobatic exercise in which a person's body rotates 360° around a horizontal axis with the feet passing over the head. A somersault can be performed forwards, backwards or sideways and can be executed in the air or on the ground. When performed on the ground, it is typically called a roll.

Types

Body positions
Somersault may be performed with different positions, including tucked, piked (bent at the hips), straddled, and layout (straight body).

Direction
The sport of tumbling does not require participants to combine both front and back elements, and most tumblers prefer back tumbling as it is easier to build momentum.

Arabian saltos begin backwards, continue with a half twist to forwards, and end with one or more saltos forwards. They can be trained by beginning with an Arabian dive roll and adding a front salto to it. They are counted as front tumbling in women's artistic gymnastics and back tumbling in men's artistic gymnastics.

Twists
Somersaults are often completed with twists.

Multiple rotations
By 2003, the tucked double back salto had become common in women's gymnastics. The triple back salto exists in men's gymnastics but was rarely competed until 2017.

In 2019, American gymnast Simone Biles was the first woman to compete a back triple double: two saltos backwards with three twists in a tucked position.

See also 
 Aerial cartwheel
 Cartwheel (gymnastics)
 Roll (gymnastics)
 Trampolining
 Tumbling
 Parkour
 Handspring
 Diving
 Tumble turn

References 

Gymnastics elements